An elliptical dome, or an oval dome, is a dome whose bottom cross-section takes the form of an ellipse. Technically, an ellipsoidal dome has a circular cross-section, so is not quite the same.

While the cupola can take different geometries, when the ceiling's cross-section takes the form of an ellipse, and due to the reflecting properties of an ellipse, any two persons standing at a focus of the floor's ellipse can have one whisper, and the other hears; this is a whispering gallery.

The largest elliptical dome in the world is at the Sanctuary of Vicoforte in Vicoforte, Italy.

In architecture

Elliptical domes have many applications in architecture; and are useful in covering rectangular spaces. The oblate, or horizontal elliptical dome is useful when there is a need to limit height of the space that would result from a spherical dome. As the mathematical description of an elliptical dome is more complex than that of spherical dome, design care is needed.

In a geodesic dome with a circular base, the triangular elements align so their edges form great circles. Although not geodesic, a new, elliptical design was patented in 1989; it uses hexagons and pentagons to form a dome with a cross section that is elliptical. Due to its mathematical derivation, this design is called "geotangent".

World examples

Elliptical domes come up in the design of all of the following:
 A number of mosques in Cairo, Egypt,
 Part of St. Peter's Basilica, in Rome, Italy
 The Basilica of St. Lawrence, Asheville, in Asheville, North Carolina,
 The Church of Saint Roch, Žižkov, in Prague, Czech Republic,
 The Four Domes Pavilion, in Wroclaw, Poland,
 The Indiana Theatre, in Indiana, city of Indianapolis,
 The Joe and Rika Mansueto Library, at the University of Chicago,
 The Kanteerava Indoor Stadium, in Bangalore, India,
 The Mayflower Hotel, in Washington, DC,
 The Mosque–Cathedral of Córdoba, in Andalusia,
 The Palau Nacional, in Barcelona, Spain,
 The Pisa Cathedral, in Pisa, Italy,
 The Rose Hill Mansion, Bluffton, in Bluffton, South Carolina,
 The San Filippo Neri, in Turin, region of Piedmont, Italy,
 The Sant'Andrea in Via Flaminia, in Rome, Italy,
 The Santa Caterina, Casale Monferrato, in Casale Monferrato, Province of Alessandria, region of Piedmont, Italy,
 The Seville Cathedral, Spain,
 The Skyspace Lech, Tannegg/Oberlech in Vorarlberg, the westernmost federal state of Austria,
 The State Savings Bank Building, in City of Sydney, Australia,
 The Temple Sinai, in Oakland, California, 
 The Sanctuary of Vicoforte, in Italy.

See also

 Pendentive
 Beehive house
 Beehive tomb
 Catenary arch
 Clochán
 Ellipsoid
 Onion dome
 Parabolic arch

References

External links and references

Creating elliptical domes
 Elliptical domes site
 Creating an elliptical dome
 Another reference, on creating ellitpical domes

Calculations
 Site for calculating figures related to elliptical domes
 Another site for calculations
 Dome calculator

More general references
 Buckling of Externally Pressurized Prolate Ellipsoidal Domes
 An article addressing many topics, including elliptical domes
 Use of elliptical domes, notably in Islamic architecture

Domes
Architectural elements